Colotrechnus is a genus of wasps belonging to the family Pteromalidae.

The species of this genus are found in Europe and Northern America.

Species:
 Colotrechnus agromyzae Subba Rao, 1981 
 Colotrechnus ignotus Burks, 1958

References

Pteromalidae
Hymenoptera genera